Strathyre was a railway station located at the head of Loch Lubnaig, Stirling, in Strathyre.

History
This station opened on 1 June 1870 along with the first section of the Callander and Oban Railway, between Callander and Glenoglehead (originally named 'Killin').

The station was laid out with two platforms, one on either side of a crossing loop. There were sidings on the east side of the station.

Final closure came on 27 September 1965 following a landslide in Glen Ogle.

Signalling
Strathyre signal box, which replaced the original box on 13 May 1890, was located on the Up platform, on the east side of the railway. It had 12 levers.

References

Disused railway stations in Stirling (council area)
Beeching closures in Scotland
Railway stations in Great Britain opened in 1870
Railway stations in Great Britain closed in 1965
Former Caledonian Railway stations
1870 establishments in Scotland
1965 disestablishments in Scotland